You Belong to Me is a 2008 compilation album of songs by American artist Jo Stafford. Released on the Dynamic label on April 8, 2008, the album features 16 of Stafford's hits.

Track listing

 You Belong to Me
 Jambalaya		 	
 Candy		 	
 Long Ago (And Far Away)		 	
 Serenade of the Bells		 	
 Teach Me Tonight		 	
 That's for Me		 	
 Day by Day		 	
 If		 	
 My Darling, My Darling		 	
 Shrimp Boats		 	
 Symphony		 	
 A-Round the Corner		 	
 Hey Good Lookin'		 	
 I Love You		 	
 It's Almost Tomorrow

References

2008 compilation albums
Jo Stafford compilation albums